Lippo I Alidosi was the de facto lord of Imola, northern Italy, in 1278–1288, as captain of the people and Defensor Pupuli Imole et Capitaneus Civitatis Imole.

He was made prisoner by the Papal Inquisitor of Romagna, together with his nephew Lippo II. In 1317 he plotted to conquer again Imola, but died soon later.

1310s deaths
Lippo 1
Year of birth unknown